Starlink is a satellite internet constellation operated by SpaceX, providing satellite Internet access coverage to 50 countries. It also aims for global mobile phone service after 2023. SpaceX started launching Starlink satellites in 2019. As of February 2023, Starlink consists of over 3,580 mass-produced small satellites in low Earth orbit (LEO), which communicate with designated ground transceivers. In total, nearly 12,000 satellites are planned to be deployed, with a possible later extension to 42,000. SpaceX announced reaching more than one million subscribers in December 2022.

The SpaceX satellite development facility in Redmond, Washington houses the Starlink research, development, manufacturing, and orbit control teams. The cost of the decade-long project to design, build, and deploy the constellation was estimated by SpaceX in May 2018 to be at least US$10 billion. SpaceX expects more than $30 billion in revenue by 2025 from its satellite constellation, while revenues from its launch business were expected to reach $5 billion in the same year.

Astronomers have raised concerns about the effect the constellation can have on ground-based astronomy and how the satellites will add to an already congested orbital environment. SpaceX has attempted to mitigate astronomy concerns by implementing several upgrades to Starlink satellites aimed at reducing their brightness during operation. The satellites are equipped with krypton or argon-fueled Hall thrusters which allow them to de-orbit at the end of their life. Additionally, the satellites are designed to autonomously avoid collisions based on uplinked tracking data.

History

Background 
Constellations of low Earth orbit satellites were first conceptualized in the mid-1980s as part of the Strategic Defense Initiative, culminating in Brilliant Pebbles, where weapons were to be staged in orbit to intercept ballistic missiles on short notice. The potential for low-latency communication was also recognized and development offshoots in the 1990s led to numerous commercial megaconstellations using around 100 satellites such as Celestron, Teledesic, Iridium, and Globalstar. However all entities entered bankruptcy by the dot-com bubble burst, due in part to excessive launch costs at the time.

In 2004, Larry Williams, SpaceX VP of Strategic Relations and former VP of Teledesic's "Internet in the sky" program, opened the SpaceX Washington DC office. That June, SpaceX acquired a stake in Surrey Satellite Technology (SSTL) as part of a "shared strategic vision". SSTL was at that time working to extend the Internet into space. However, SpaceX's stake was eventually sold back to EADS Astrium in 2008 after the company became more focused on navigation and Earth observation.

In early 2014, Elon Musk and Greg Wyler were working together planning a constellation of around 700 satellites called WorldVu, which would be over 10 times the size of the then largest Iridium satellite constellation. However, these discussions broke down in June 2014, and SpaceX instead filed an ITU application via the Norway telecom regulator under the name STEAM. SpaceX confirmed the connection in the 2016 application to license Starlink with the Federal Communications Commission (FCC). SpaceX trademarked the name Starlink in the United States for their satellite broadband network; the name was inspired by the book The Fault in Our Stars.

Development phase (2015–2020) 

Starlink was publicly announced in January 2015 with the opening of the SpaceX satellite development facility in Redmond, Washington. During the opening, Musk stated there is still significant unmet demand worldwide for low-cost broadband capabilities. and that Starlink would target bandwidth to carry up to 50% of all backhaul communications traffic, and up to 10% of local Internet traffic, in high-density cities. Musk further stated that the positive cash flow from selling satellite internet services would be necessary to fund their Mars plans. Furthermore, SpaceX has long-term plans to develop and deploy a version of the satellite communication system to serve Mars.

In August 2018, SpaceX consolidated all their Seattle-area operations with a move to a larger three-building facility at Redmond Ridge Corporate Center to support satellite manufacturing in addition to R&D. In July 2016, SpaceX acquired an additional  creative space in Irvine, California (Orange County). The Irvine office would include signal processing, RFIC, and ASIC development for the satellite program.

By October 2016, the satellite division was focusing on a significant business challenge of achieving a sufficiently low-cost design for the user equipment. SpaceX President Gwynne Shotwell said then that the project remained in the "design phase as the company seeks to tackle issues related to user-terminal cost".

In November 2016, SpaceX filed an application with the FCC for a "non-geostationary orbit (NGSO) satellite system in the Fixed-Satellite Service using the Ku- and Ka- frequency bands".

In March 2017, SpaceX filed plans with the FCC to field a second orbital shell of more than 7,500 "V-band satellites in non-geosynchronous orbits to provide communications services" in an electromagnetic spectrum that has not previously been heavily employed for commercial communications services. Called the "Very-Low Earth Orbit (VLEO) constellation", it was to have comprised 7,518 satellites that were to orbit at just  altitude, while the smaller, originally planned group of 4,425 satellites would operate in the Ka- and Ku-bands and orbit at  altitude.  In the event, by 2022 SpaceX had withdrawn plans to field the 7518-satellite V-band system superseding in with a more comprehensive second-generation (Gen2) Starlink satellite design.

In September 2017, the FCC ruled that half of the constellation must be in orbit within six years to comply with licensing terms, while the full system should be in orbit within nine years from the date of the license.

SpaceX filed documents in late 2017 with the FCC to clarify their space debris mitigation plan, under which the company was to:
"...implement an operations plan for the orderly de-orbit of satellites nearing the end of their useful lives (roughly five to seven years) at a rate far faster than is required under international standards. [Satellites] will de-orbit by propulsively moving to a disposal orbit from which they will re-enter the Earth's atmosphere within approximately one year after completion of their mission."

In March 2018, the FCC granted SpaceX approval for the initial 4,425 satellites, with some conditions. SpaceX would need to obtain a separate approval from the International Telecommunication Union (ITU). The FCC supported a NASA request to ask SpaceX to achieve an even higher level of de-orbiting reliability than the standard that NASA had previously used for itself: reliably de-orbiting 90% of the satellites after their missions are complete.

In May 2018, SpaceX expected the total cost of development and buildout of the constellation to approach $10 billion. In mid-2018, SpaceX reorganized the satellite development division in Redmond, and terminated several members of senior management.

In November 2018, SpaceX received U.S. regulatory approval to deploy 7,518 V-band broadband satellites, in addition to the 4,425 approved earlier; however, the V-band plans were subsequently withdrawn by 2022.
In total, nearly 12,000 satellites were planned to be deployed, with (as of 2019) a possible later extension to 42,000.

In February 2019, a sister company of SpaceX, SpaceX Services Inc., filed a request with the FCC to receive a license for the operation of up to a million fixed satellite Earth stations that would communicate with its non-geostationary orbit (NGSO) satellite Starlink system.

In June 2019, SpaceX applied to the FCC for a license to test up to 270 ground terminals – 70 nationwide across the United States and 200 in Washington state at SpaceX employee homes – and aircraft-borne antenna operation from four distributed United States airfields; as well as five ground-to-ground test locations.

By late 2019, SpaceX was transitioning their satellite efforts from research and development to manufacturing, with the planned first launch of a large group of satellites to orbit, and the clear need to achieve an average launch rate of "44 high-performance, low-cost spacecraft built and launched every month for the next 60 months" to get the 2,200 satellites launched to support their FCC spectrum allocation license assignment. SpaceX said they will meet the deadline of having half the constellation "in orbit within six years of authorization... and the full system in nine years".

On 15 October 2019, the United States FCC submitted filings to the International Telecommunication Union (ITU) on SpaceX's behalf to arrange spectrum for 30,000 additional Starlink satellites to supplement the 12,000 Starlink satellites already approved by the FCC.
That month, Musk publicly tested the Starlink network by using an Internet connection routed through the network to post a first tweet to social media site Twitter.

In November 2020, Starlink beta internet service was opened to the public. Starlink beta testers reported speeds over 150 megabits per second, above the range announced for the public beta test.

Commercial service (2021–) 

In February 2021, SpaceX opened up pre-orders to the public. SpaceX completed raising an additional $3.5 billion  in equity financing over the previous six months, to support the capital-intensive phase of the operational fielding of Starlink, plus the development of the Starship launch system. In April 2021, SpaceX clarified that they have already tested two generations of Starlink technology, with the second one having been less expensive than the first. The third generation, with laser inter-satellite links, is expected to begin  launching "in the next few months [and will be] much less expensive than earlier versions".

On 6 November 2020, Innovation, Science and Economic Development Canada announced regulatory approval for the Starlink low Earth orbit satellite constellation.

The FCC initially awarded SpaceX with $885.5 million worth of federal subsidies to support rural broadband customers through the company's Starlink satellite Internet network. SpaceX won subsidies to bring service to customers in 35 U.S. states. The $885.5 million aid package was revoked in August 2022, with the FCC stating that Starlink "failed to demonstrate" its ability to deliver the promised service. SpaceX later appealed the decision saying they met or surpassed all RDOF deployment requirements that existed during bidding and that the FCC created "new standards that no bidder could meet today".

In March 2021, SpaceX submitted an application to the FCC for mobile variations of their terminal for vehicles, vessels and aircraft.

In May 2021, SpaceX announced agreements with Google Cloud Platform and Microsoft Azure to provide on-ground compute and networking services for Starlink. Viasat made a legal attempt to temporarily halt Starlink launches.
In June 2021, SpaceX applied to the FCC to use mobile Starlink transceivers on launch vehicles flying to Earth orbit, after having previously tested high-altitude low-velocity mobile use on a rocket prototype in May 2021.

By 1 October 2021, SpaceX had sold 5000 Starlink preorders in India, and announced that Sanjay Bhargava, who had worked with Musk as part of a team that founded electronic payment firm PayPal, would head the tech billionaire entrepreneur's Starlink satellite broadband venture in India. Three months later, Bhargava resigned "for personal reasons" following the Indian government ordering SpaceX to halt selling preorders for Starlink service until SpaceX gains regulatory approval for providing satellite internet services in the country.

In 2022 SpaceX announced the Starlink Business service tier, a higher performance edition of the service. It provides a larger high-performance antenna and listed speeds of between 150 and 500 Mbit/s, with a cost of $2500 for the antenna and a $500 monthly service fee. The service includes 24/7, prioritized support. Deliveries are advertised to begin in the second quarter of 2022. The FCC also approved the licensing of Starlink services to boats, aircraft, and moving vehicles. Starlink terminal production being delayed by the 2020–present global chip shortage led to only 5,000 subscribers for the first two months of 2022 but this was soon resolved.

On 26 February 2022, Musk announced that Starlink satellites had been activated over Ukraine after a request from the Ukrainian government to replace internet services destroyed during the 2022 Russian invasion of Ukraine.

In May 2022, Starlink entered the Philippine market, as the company's first deployment in Asia, due to a landmark legislative change (RA 11659, Public Services Act) about all-foreign allowance of company ownership in regards to utility entities such as internet and telco companies. Starlink was able to obtain a provisional permission from the country's Department of Information and Communication Technologies (DICT), National Telecommunications Commission (NTC) and Department of Trade and Industry (DTI) and soon began commercial services, aimed at regions with lower internet connectivity.

Also in May 2022, Chinese military researchers published an article in a peer-reviewed journal describing a strategy for destroying the Starlink constellation if they threaten national security. The researchers specifically highlight concerns with reported Starlink military capabilities. Musk later announced that "Starlink is meant for peaceful use... to mend the fault in our stars", referencing a quote from Julius Caesar, "Men at some time are masters of their fates: The fault, dear Brutus, is not in our stars, But in ourselves, that we are underlings." Suggesting Starlink could enforce peace by taking strategic initiative. The head of Russia's space agency, Dmitry Rogozin, had earlier warned Musk that "you will have to answer in an adult way, Elon, no matter how you play the fool".

In 2022, SpaceX unveiled new variants of the Starlink service. On 23 May 2022, SpaceX rolled out Starlink For RVs, a service that lets customers pay more to skip waitlists to connect to its broadband satellites without a fixed address, although connection speeds for other users will be prioritized. On 7 July 2022 SpaceX announced Starlink Maritime, to help support users, and companies, on the ocean. Only working on the water, unable to work on land, the advertised speed for the service is set up to 350 Mbps. However it comes at the one time price of $10,000 for the two user terminals, and $5,000 monthly price.

In August 2022, SpaceX secured its first contract for services in the passenger shipping industry. Royal Caribbean Group has added Starlink internet to Freedom of the Seas and plans to offer the service on 50 ships under its Royal Caribbean International, Celebrity Cruises, and Silversea Cruises brands by March 2023. Starlink services on private jet charter flights in the US by JSX are expected to begin in late 2022, and Hawaiian Airlines has contracted to provide "Starlink services on transpacific flights to and from Hawaii in 2023."

In September 2022, SpaceX sent out an email to users with pre-orders about a service called Best Effort. It allows those still waiting in a full capacity cell to receive the unused bandwidth of their cell, while still being on the waiting list for more prioritized service. The price and equipment are the same as the residential service coming in at $110 per month. In December, a monthly 1TB data cap was introduced to subscribers.

According to Ookla, between Q1 and Q2 2022, Starlink speeds decreased worldwide as more people signed up for Starlink, although SpaceX has said that Starlink speeds will improve once more satellites are operational.

On 1 December 2022, the FCC issued an approval for SpaceX to launch the initial 7500 satellites for its second-generation (Gen2) constellation, in three low-Earth-orbit orbital shells, at 525, 530, and 535 km altitude. Overall, SpaceX had requested approval for as many as 29,988 Gen2 satellites, with approximately 10,000 in the 525–535 km altitude shells, plus ~20,000 in 340–360 km shells and nearly 500 in 604–614-km shells. However, the FCC noted that this is not a net increase in approved on-orbit satellites for SpaceX since SpaceX is no longer planning to deploy 7518 V-band satellites at  altitude that had previously been authorized.

In March 2023, the company reported that they were manufacturing six Starlink "V2 Mini" satellites per day as well as thousands of users terminals.  The V2 Mini has Gen2 Starkink satellite features while being assembled in a smaller form factor than the larger Gen2 sats. The Gen2 satellites require the 9-meter-diameter Starship in order to launch them. The Starlink business unit had a single cash-flow-positive quarter during 2022, and is expecting to be profitable in 2023.

Services

Satellite internet 

Starlink provides satellite-based internet connectivity to underserved areas of the planet, as well as competitively priced service in more urbanized areas.

In the United States, Starlink charged a one-time hardware fee of $599 for a user terminal and $120 per month for internet service at a fixed service address location. An additional $25 per month allows the user terminal to move beyond a fixed location (Starlink For RVs) but with service speeds deprioritized compared to the fixed users in that area. Fixed users are told to expect typical throughput of "50 Mbps to 150 Mbps and latency from 20 ms to 40 ms". A higher performance version of the service (Starlink Business) advertises speeds of 150 to 500 Mbps in exchange for a more costly $2,500 user terminal and a $500 monthly service fee. Another service called Starlink Maritime became available in July 2022 providing internet access on the open ocean, with speeds of 350 Mbps, requiring purchase of a maritime-grade $10,000 user terminal and a $5,000 monthly service fee.

Sales are capped to a few hundred fixed users per 20 km "service cell area" due to limited wireless capacity. Starlink alternatively offers a Best Effort service tier allowing homes in capped areas to receive the current unused bandwidth of their cell while they are on the waiting list for more prioritized service. The price and equipment are the same as the residential service at $110 per month. To improve the service quality in densely populated areas, Starlink introduced a monthly 1TB data cap for all non-business users which became enforced in 2023.

In August 2022 SpaceX lowered monthly service costs for users in select countries. For example, users in Brazil and Chile saw monthly fee decreases of about 50%.

, Starlink has over one million active subscribers. In February 2023 it was reported that Starlink had 95,000 subscribers in Australia.

Satellite cellular service 
For a future service, T-Mobile US and SpaceX are partnering to add satellite cellular service capability to Starlink satellites. It will provide dead-zone cell phone coverage across the US using existing midband PCS spectrum that T-Mobile owns. Cell coverage will begin with messaging and expand to include voice and limited data services later, with testing to begin in 2023. T-Mobile plans to connect to Starlink satellites via existing mobile devices, unlike previous generations of satellite phones which used specialized radios, modems, and antennas to connect to satellites in higher orbits.  Bandwidth will be limited to approximately 2 to 4 megabits per second total, split across a very large cell coverage area; so limited to approximately 1,000 voice callers in a cell. The size of a single coverage cell has not yet been publicly released, but the satellites are 7 meters long, and the antenna would fold out to be "roughly 25 square meters".

In March 2023, SpaceX confirmed that they remain on track to begin testing the service in 2023.

Military satellites 

SpaceX also designs, builds, and launches customized military satellites based on variants of the Starlink satellite bus, with the largest publicly known customer being the Space Development Agency.

In 2018 the Space Development Agency (SDA) was formed as part of a Trump Administration effort to resurrect the Reagan-era Strategic Defense Initiative (SDI). SDA accelerates development of missile defense capabilities using industry-procured low-cost low Earth orbit satellite platforms. The program was conceived and instituted by Under Secretary of Defense (R&E) Michael D. Griffin (who had decades earlier joined Musk on his trip to Russia to examine ICBMs as part of SpaceX's founding). A few months after Space Development Agency was announced, SpaceX Chief Operating Officer Gwynne Shotwell was asked by the United States Air Force, given the nature of the program, whether SpaceX would launch weapons into space for the US military. She affirmed "we would if it's for the defense of this country."

In October 2020, SDA awarded SpaceX an initial $150 million dual-use contract to develop a deluxe military version of the Starlink satellites. The first batch of satellites were originally scheduled to launch September 2022 to form part of the Tracking Layer (Tranche 0) of the Space Force's National Defense Space Architecture (NDSA). However, the launch schedule slipped multiple times and is currently scheduled for March 2023.

The NDSA will be composed of seven layers with specific functions: data transport, battle management, missile tracking, custody/weapons targeting, satellite navigation, deterrence, and ground support. Historically, space-based missile defense concepts (e.g., Brilliant Pebbles) were expensive, but reusable launch systems have mitigated costs according to a 2019 Congressional Budget Office analysis. NSDA leverages existing commercial satellite bus development such as Starlink to reduce costs, including free-space optical laser terminals for a secure command and control mesh network. The 2019 Missile Defense Review notes space-based sensing enables "improved tracking and potentially targeting of advanced threats, including HGVs and hypersonic cruise missiles". However, the Union of Concerned Scientists warns developments could escalate tensions with Russia and China and called the project "fundamentally destabilizing". The Carnegie Endowment for International Peace later advocated for a treaty halting development to prevent an arms race in space.

Since 2021, Starlink's military satellite development is overseen internally at SpaceX by retired four-star general Terrence J. O'Shaughnessy. O'Shaughnessy advocated before the United States Senate Committee on Armed Services for a layered capability with lethal follow-on that incorporates machine learning and artificial intelligence to gather and act upon sensor data quickly.

Starshield program

In December 2022, SpaceX announced Starshield, a program to incorporate military or government entity payloads on board a customized satellite bus (potentially based on Starlink Block v1.5 and v2.0 technology). These satellites are heavier, with twice the area as a single Starlink v1.5 and have two pair of solar arrays as opposed to one on Starlink Block v1.5. While Starlink is designed for consumer and commercial use, Starshield is designed for US government use, with an initial focus on three areas, namely, earth observation, communications and hosting payloads.

Designed to meet diverse mission requirements, Starshield satellites are advertised as capable of integrating a wide variety of payloads, offering unique versatility to users. Starshield satellites will be compatible with, and interconnect to, the existing commercial Starlink satellites via optical inter-satellite links.

In January 2022, SpaceX deployed four national security satellites for the US government on their Transporter-3 rideshare mission. In the same year they launched another group of four U.S. satellites with a single on-orbit spare Globalstar FM-15 satellite in June. Their purpose was not disclosed at the time of launch, but was considered likely either technical demonstration, communications, earth observation or signals intelligence.

It is suspected the four SpaceX-built Space Development Agency Tranche 0 Tracking Layer satellites due to launch in Q1 2023 are also based on the Starshield satellite bus.

Military communications 
In 2019, tests by the United States Air Force Research Laboratory (AFRL) demonstrated a 610 Mbit/s data link through Starlink to a Beechcraft C-12 Huron aircraft in flight. Additionally, in late 2019, the United States Air Force successfully tested a connection with Starlink on an AC-130 Gunship.

In 2020, the Air Force utilized Starlink in support of its Advanced Battlefield management system during a live-fire exercise. They demonstrated Starlink connected to a "variety of air and terrestrial assets" including the Boeing KC-135 Stratotanker.

Use in Ukraine 

On 26 February 2022, Musk announced that Starlink satellites had been activated over Ukraine after a request from the Ukrainian government to replace internet services destroyed during the 2022 Russian invasion of Ukraine. By 6 April 2022, SpaceX had sent over 5000 Starlink terminals to Ukraine to allow Ukrainians access to the Starlink network; SpaceX had donated 3667 or 73% of the 5000 terminals and removed the monthly service fees, and USAID had purchased the balance of the terminals. According to The Washington Post, The Starlink equipment sent to Ukraine was funded by SpaceX including partial funding by the U.S. Agency for International Development, as well as the governments of France and Poland. By mid August, Ukraine internet service was being provided by more than 20,000 Starlink terminals, some from foreign partners and volunteers, in addition to many provided directly by SpaceX. During the war, Ukrainians can use Starlink terminals without paying the normal monthly subscription fee; by year-end, Musk estimated the cost of Starlink's donation at $20 million per month.

In May 2022 a Starlink-enabled Ukrainian Internet App was the key component of a successful new artillery fire coordination system. While military and government use of the Starlink has been the most important aspect of opening Ukraine to low-altitude satellite internet services in early 2022, civilians are also heavily using the technology "to keep in touch with the outside world and tell loved ones that they are alive."

On September 30, Ukrainian forces reported major Starlink outages across the frontline, resulting in "catastrophic" losses of communication. CNN reported Starlink services had to be requested by Ukrainian forces as new areas were liberated. In February, Gwynne Shotwell revealed SpaceX had "taken steps to limit Starlink’s use in Ukraine supporting offensive military operations," such as use with drones. This came in the wake of threats issued on 3 February by a Kremlin-backed spokesman Vladimir Solovyov over use of the commercial service by Ukraine to attack Russian targets, calling Musk a "war criminal".

By February, SpaceX restricted the licensing of Starlink communication technology, excluding direct military use of Starlink on weapon systems. The limitation restricted use by Ukraine of Starlink antennas on uncrewed surface vehicles (USVs) deployed in the fall, potentially shifting the balance of power in the naval war in the Black Sea. In the view of Naval News, "The Black Sea appears to be becoming more Russian friendly again."

Availability and regulatory approval by country 

In order to offer satellite services in any nation-state, International Telecommunication Union (ITU) regulations and long-standing international treaties require that landing rights be granted by each country jurisdiction, and within a country, by the national communications regulators. As a result, even though the Starlink network has near-global reach at latitudes below approximately 60°, broadband services can only be provided in 40 countries as of September 2022. SpaceX can also have business operation and economic considerations that may make a difference in which countries Starlink service is offered, in which order, and how soon. For example, SpaceX formally requested authorization for Canada only in June 2020, the Canadian regulatory authority approved it in November 2020, and SpaceX rolled out service two months later, in January 2021. As of September 2022, Starlink services were on offer in 40 countries, with applications pending regulatory approval in many more.

Japan's major mobile provider, KDDI, announced a partnership with SpaceX to begin offering in 2022 expanded connectivity for its rural mobile customers via 1,200 remote mobile towers.

On 25 April 2022, Hawaiian Airlines announced an agreement with Starlink to provide free internet access on its aircraft, becoming the first airline to use Starlink. By July 2022, Starlink internet service was available in 36 countries and 41 markets.

In May 2022, it was announced that regulatory approval had been granted for Nigeria, Mozambique, and the Philippines. However, delays have set back a launch until mid-2023.

Technology

Satellite hardware 
Initial plans  were for the constellation to be made up of approximately 4,000 cross-linked satellites, more than twice as many operational satellites as were in orbit in January 2015.

The satellites will employ optical inter-satellite links and phased array beam-forming and digital processing technologies in the Ku and Ka microwave bands (super high frequency [SHF] to extremely high frequency [EHF]), according to documents filed with the U.S. FCC. While specifics of the phased array technologies have been disclosed as part of the frequency application, SpaceX enforced confidentiality regarding details of the optical inter-satellite links. Early satellites were launched without laser links. The inter-satellite laser links were successfully tested in late 2020.

The satellites will be mass-produced, at a much lower cost per unit of capability than previously existing satellites. Musk said, "We're going to try and do for satellites what we've done for rockets." "In order to revolutionize space, we have to address both satellites and rockets." "Smaller satellites are crucial to lowering the cost of space-based Internet and communications".

In February 2015, SpaceX asked the FCC to consider future innovative uses of the Ka-band spectrum before the FCC commits to 5G communications regulations that would create barriers to entry, since SpaceX is a new entrant to the satellite communications market. The SpaceX non-geostationary orbit communications satellite constellation will operate in the high-frequency bands above 24 GHz, "where steerable Earth station transmit antennas would have a wider geographic impact, and significantly lower satellite altitudes magnify the impact of aggregate interference from terrestrial transmissions".

Internet traffic via a geostationary satellite has a minimum theoretical round-trip latency of at least 477 milliseconds (ms; between user and ground gateway), but in practice, current satellites have latencies of 600 ms or more. The system will use a peer-to-peer protocol claimed to be "simpler than IPv6", it will also incorporate end-to-end encryption natively.

Starlink satellites use Hall-effect thrusters with krypton or argon gas as the reaction mass for orbit raising and station keeping. Krypton Hall thrusters tend to exhibit significantly higher erosion of the flow channel compared to a similar electric propulsion system operated with xenon, but krypton is much more abundant and has a lower market price. SpaceX claims that its 2nd generation thruster using argon has 2.4x the thrust and 1.5x the specific impulse of the krypton fueled thruster.

User terminals 

The system does not directly connect from its satellites to handsets (like the constellations from Iridium, Globalstar, Thuraya and Inmarsat). Instead, it is linked to flat user terminals the size of a pizza box, which have phased array antennas and track the satellites. The terminals can be mounted anywhere, as long as they can see the sky. This includes fast-moving objects like trains. Photographs of the customer antennas were first seen on the internet in June 2020, supporting earlier statements by SpaceX CEO Musk that the terminals would look like a "UFO on a stick. Starlink Terminal has motors to self-adjust optimal angle to view sky". The antenna is known internally as "Dishy McFlatface".

In October 2020, SpaceX launched a paid-for beta service in the U.S. called "Better Than Nothing Beta", charging $499 for a user terminal, with an expected service of "50 Mbps to 150 Mbps and latency from 20 ms to 40 ms over the next several months". From January 2021, the paid-for beta service was extended to other continents, starting with the United Kingdom.

A larger, high-performance version of the antenna is available for use with the Starlink Business service tier.

In September 2020, SpaceX applied for permission to put terminals on 10 of its ships with the expectation of entering the maritime market in the future.

Ground stations 
SpaceX has made applications to the FCC for at least 32 ground stations in United States, and  has approvals for five of them (in five states). Till February 2023 Starlink used the Ka-band to connect with ground stations. with the launch of v2 mini they added frequencies in the E band range.

A typical ground station right now has nine 2.86 m antennas in a 400 m2 fenced in area.

According to their filing, SpaceX's ground stations would also be installed on-site at Google data-centers world-wide.

Satellite revisions

MicroSat 
MicroSat-1a and MicroSat-1b were originally slated to be launched into  circular orbits at approximately 86.4° inclination, and to include panchromatic video imager cameras to film images of Earth and the satellite. The two satellites, "MicroSat-1a" and "MicroSat-1b" were meant to be launched together as secondary payloads on one of the Iridium-NEXT flights, but they were instead used for ground-based tests.

Tintin 
At the time of the June 2015 announcement, SpaceX had stated plans to launch the first two demonstration satellites in 2016, but the target date was subsequently moved out to 2018. SpaceX began flight testing their satellite technologies in 2018 with the launch of two test satellites. The two identical satellites were called MicroSat-2a and MicroSat-2b during development but were renamed Tintin A and Tintin B upon orbital deployment on 22 February 2018. The satellites were launched by a Falcon 9 rocket, and they were piggy-pack payloads launching with the Paz satellite.

Tintin A and B were inserted into a  orbit. Per FCC filings, they were intended to raise themselves to an  orbit, the operational altitude for Starlink LEO satellites per the earliest regulatory filings, but stayed close to their original orbits. SpaceX announced in November 2018 that they would like to operate an initial shell of about 1600 satellites in the constellation at about  orbital altitude, at an altitude similar to the orbits Tintin A and B stayed in.

The satellites orbit in a circular low Earth orbit at about  altitude in a high-inclination orbit for a planned six to twelve-month duration. The satellites communicate with three testing ground stations in Washington State and California for short-term experiments of less than ten minutes duration, roughly daily.

v0.9 (test) 
The 60 Starlink v0.9 satellites, launched in May 2019, have the following characteristics:
 Flat-panel design with multiple high-throughput antennas and a single solar array
 Mass: 
 Hall-effect thrusters using krypton as the reaction mass, for position adjustment on orbit, altitude maintenance, and deorbit
 Star tracker navigation system for precision pointing
 Able to use Department of Defense-provided debris data to autonomously avoid collision
 Altitude of 
 95% of "all components of this design will quickly burn in Earth's atmosphere at the end of each satellite's lifecycle".

v1.0 (operational) 
The Starlink v1.0 satellites, launched since November 2019, have the following additional characteristics:
 100% of all components of this design will completely demise, or burn up, in Earth's atmosphere at the end of each satellite's life.
 Ka-band added
 Mass: 
 One of them, numbered 1130 and called DarkSat, had its albedo reduced using a special coating but the method was abandoned due to thermal issues and IR reflectivity.
 All satellites launched since the ninth launch at August 2020 have visors to block sunlight from reflecting from parts of the satellite to reduce its albedo further.

v1.5 (operational) 
The Starlink v1.5 satellites, launched since 24 January 2021, have the following additional characteristics:

 Lasers for inter-satellite communication
 Mass: ∼
 Visors that blocked sunlight were removed from satellites launched from September 2021 onwards.

Starshield (operational) 
These are satellites buses with two solar arrays derived from Starlink v1.5 and v2.0 for military use and can host classified government or military payloads.

v2.0 (initial deployment) 
SpaceX was preparing for the production of Starlink v2.0 satellites by early 2021. According to Musk, Starlink v2.0 satellites will have "useful bits of data is almost an order of magnitude better than Starlink 1" in terms of communications bandwidth.

SpaceX hoped to begin launching Starlink v2.0 in 2022. , SpaceX had said publicly that the satellites of second-generation (Gen2) constellation would need to be launched on Starship, as they are too large to fit inside a Falcon 9 fairing. However, in August 2022, SpaceX made formal regulatory filings with the FCC that indicated they would build satellites of the second-generation (Gen2) constellation in two different, but technically identical, form factors: one with the physical structures tailored to launching on Falcon 9, and one tailored for the launching on Starship. Starlink v2.0 is both larger and heavier than Starlink v1 satellites.

Starlink second-generation satellites planned for launch on Starship have the following characteristics:
 Lasers for inter-satellite communication
 Mass: ∼
 Length: ∼
 Further improvements to reduce its brightness, including the use of a dielectric mirror film.
 On 2,016 of the initially licensed 7,500 satellites: Gen2 Starlink satellites will also include an approximately 25 square meter antenna that would allow T-Mobile subscribers to be able to communicate directly via satellite through their regular mobile devices. It will be implemented via a German-licensed hosted payload developed together with SpaceX's subsidiary Swarm Technologies and T-Mobile. This hardware is supplemental to the existing Ku-band and Ka-band systems, and inter-satellite laser links, that have been on the first generation satellites launching as of mid-2022.

Further, in October 2022, SpaceX redefined some early v2.0s so there are 3 different busses of v2.0s:

 Bus F9-1 (planned), 303 kg mass, having roughly the same dimensions and mass as the current V1.5 satellites.
The Solar arrays are 2 in number. It could offer around 3-4 times more usable bandwidth per satellite. They are smaller than Starlink's original ones (and so can be launched from existing rockets), have four times the capacity to the ground station to increase speed and capacity. This is due to a more efficient array of antennas and the use of radio frequencies in the E band range.
 Bus Starship (planned), 2000 kg mass.

Launches 

Between February 2018 and February 2023, SpaceX successfully launched 4002 Starlink satellites into orbit, including prototypes and satellites that later failed or were de-orbited before entering operational service.  In March 2020, SpaceX reported producing six satellites per day.

The deployment of the first 1,440 satellites was planned in 72 orbital planes of 20 satellites each, with a requested lower minimum elevation angle of beams to improve reception: 25° rather than the 40° of the other two orbital shells. SpaceX launched the first 60 satellites of the constellation in May 2019 into a  orbit and expected up to six launches in 2019 at that time, with 720 satellites (12 × 60) for continuous coverage in 2020.

Starlink satellites are also planned to launch on Starship, an under-development rocket of SpaceX with a much larger payload capability. The initial announcement included plans to launch 400 Starlink (version 1.0) satellites at a time. Current plans now call for Starship to be the only launch vehicle to be used to launch fewer of the much larger Starlink version 2.0.

Constellation design and status

First Generation 
Contains all v0.9 and first generation satellites. Tintin A and Tintin B as test satellites are not included.

In April 2020, SpaceX modified the architecture of the Starlink network. SpaceX submitted an application to the FCC proposing to operate more satellites in lower orbits in the first phase than the FCC previously authorized. SpaceX also applied in the United States for use of the E-band in their constellation The FCC approved the application in April 2021.

On 24 January 2021 SpaceX released a new group of 10 Starlink satellites, the first Starlink satellites in polar orbits. The launch surpassed ISRO's record of launching the most satellites in one mission (143), taking to 1,025 the cumulative number of satellites deployed for Starlink to that date.

On 3 February 2022, 49 satellites were launched as Starlink Group 47. A G2-rated geomagnetic storm occurred on 4 February, caused the atmosphere to warm and density at the low deployment altitudes to increase. Predictions were that up to 40 of the 49 satellites might be lost due to drag. After the event, 38 satellites reentered the atmosphere by 12 February while the remaining 11 were able to raise their orbits and avoid loss due to the storm.

In October 2022 SpaceX notified the FCC it plans to add V-band payload to the second generation satellites rather than fly phase 2 V-band satellites as originally planned and authorized. The request is subject to FCC approval.

Second Generation (2A) 

With the unknown of when Starship will be able to launch the second generation satellites, SpaceX modified the original V2 blueprint into a smaller, more compact one named "V2 Mini". This adjustment, allowed Falcon 9 to transport these satellites, though not as many, into orbit. The first launch of the second satellites occurred on Monday, February 27, 2023, at Cape Canaveral Space Force Station in Florida on SLC-40. Falcon 9 successfully carried 21 of these satellites into orbit later that evening. SpaceX committed to reducing debris by keeping the Starlink tension rods, which hold the V2 mini-satellites together, attached to the Falcon 9 second stage. These tension rods were discarded into orbit while launching an earlier versions of Starlink satellites. Observations confirm these V2 mini-satellites host two solar panels like the Starship V2 satellites.

Leadership 
 Gwynne Shotwell, President and COO

Impact on astronomy 

The planned large number of satellites has been met with criticism from the astronomical community because of concerns over light pollution. Astronomers claim that the number of visible satellites will outnumber visible stars and that their brightness in both optical and radio wavelengths will severely impact scientific observations. While astronomers can schedule observations to avoid pointing where satellites currently orbit, it is "getting more difficult" as more satellites come online. The International Astronomical Union (IAU), National Radio Astronomy Observatory (NRAO), and Square Kilometre Array Organization (SKAO) have released official statements expressing concern on the matter.

On 20 November 2019, the four-meter (13') Blanco telescope of the Cerro Tololo Inter-American Observatory (CTIO) recorded strong signal loss and the appearance of 19 white lines on a DECam shot (right image). This image noise was correlated to the transit of a Starlink satellite train, launched a week earlier.

SpaceX representatives and Musk have claimed that the satellites will have minimal impact, being easily mitigated by pixel masking and image stacking. However, professional astronomers have disputed these claims based on initial observation of the Starlink v0.9 satellites on the first launch, shortly after their deployment from the launch vehicle. In later statements on Twitter, Musk stated that SpaceX will work on reducing the albedo of the satellites and will provide on-demand orientation adjustments for astronomical experiments, if necessary. One Starlink satellite (Starlink 1130 / DarkSat) launched with an experimental coating to reduce its albedo. The reduction in g-band magnitude is 0.8 magnitude (55%). Despite these measures, astronomers found that the satellites were still too bright thus making DarkSat essentially a "dead end".

On 17 April 2020, SpaceX wrote in an FCC filing that it would test new methods of mitigating light pollution, and also provide access to satellite tracking data for astronomers to "better coordinate their observations with our satellites". On 27 April 2020, Musk announced that the company would introduce a new sunshade designed to reduce the brightness of Starlink satellites. , over 200 Starlink satellites had a sunshade. An October 2020 analysis found them to be only marginally fainter than DarkSat. A January 2021 study pinned the brightness at 31% of the original design.

According to a May 2021 study, "A large number of fast-moving transmitting stations (i.e. satellites) will cause further interference. New analysis methods could mitigate some of these effects, but data loss is inevitable, increasing the time needed for each study and limiting the overall amount of science done".

In February 2022, the International Astronomical Union (IAU) established a center to help astronomers deal with the adverse effects of satellite constellations such as Starlink. Work will include the development of software tools for astronomers, advancement of national and international policies, community outreach and work with industry on relevant technologies.

In June 2022, the IAU released a website for astronomers to deal with some adverse effects via satellite tracking. This will enable astronomers to be able to track satellites to be able to avoid and time them for minimal impact on current work.

Increased risk of satellite collision 
The large number of satellites employed by Starlink may create the long-term danger of space debris resulting from placing thousands of satellites in orbit and the risk of causing a satellite collision, potentially triggering a phenomenon known as Kessler syndrome. SpaceX has said that most of the satellites are launched at a lower altitude, and failed satellites are expected to deorbit within five years without propulsion.

Early in the program, a near-miss occurred when SpaceX did not move a satellite that had a 1 in 1,000 chance of colliding with a European one, ten times higher than ESA's threshold for avoidance maneuvers. SpaceX subsequently fixed an issue with its paging system that had disrupted emails between ESA and SpaceX. ESA said it plans to invest in technologies to automate satellite collision avoidance maneuvers. In 2021, Chinese authorities lodged a complaint with the United Nations, saying their space station had performed evasive maneuvers that year to avoid Starlink satellites. In the document, Chinese delegates said that the continuously maneuvering Starlink satellites posed a risk of collision, and two close encounters with the satellites in July and October constituted dangers to the life or health of astronauts aboard the Chinese Tiangong space station.

All these reported issues, plus current plans for the extension of the constellation, motivated a formal letter from National Telecommunications and Information Administration (NTIA) on behalf of the National Aeronautics and Space Administration (NASA) and the
National Science Foundation (NSF), submitted to FCC on 8 February 2022, warning about the potential impact on LEO orbit, increased collision risk, impact on science missions, rocket launches, International Space Station and Radio frequencies Interferences. Resting credibility on the arguments for collision self-avoidance reported by SpaceX.

SpaceX satellites will maneuver if the probability of collision is greater than 1e-5 (1 in 100,000 chance of collision), as opposed to the industry standard of 1e-4 (1 in 10,000 chance of collision). SpaceX has budgeted sufficient propellant to accommodate approximately 5,000 propulsive maneuvers over the life of a Gen2 satellite, including a budget of approximately 350 collision avoidance maneuvers per satellite over that time period.

As of May 2022, the average Starlink satellite had conducted fewer than three collision-avoidance maneuvers over the 6 preceding months. Over 1,700 out of 6,873 maneuvers were performed to avoid Kosmos 1408 debris.

Competition and market effects 

In addition to the OneWeb constellation, announced nearly concurrently with the SpaceX constellation, a 2015 proposal from Samsung outlined a 4,600-satellite constellation orbiting at  that could provide a zettabyte per month capacity worldwide, an equivalent of 200 gigabytes per month for 5 billion users of Internet data, but by 2020, no more public information had been released about the Samsung constellation. Telesat announced a smaller 117 satellite constellation in 2015 with plans to deliver initial service in 2021. Amazon announced a large broadband internet satellite constellation in April 2019, planning to launch 3,236 satellites in the next decade in what the company calls "Project Kuiper", a satellite constellation that will work in concert with Amazon's previously announced large network of twelve satellite ground station facilities (the "AWS ground station unit") announced in November 2018.

In February 2015, financial analysts questioned established geosynchronous orbit communications satellite fleet operators as to how they intended to respond to the competitive threat of SpaceX and OneWeb LEO communication satellites. In October 2015, SpaceX President Gwynne Shotwell indicated that while development continues, the business case for the long-term rollout of an operational satellite network was still in an early phase.

By October 2017, the expectation for large increases in satellite network capacity from emerging lower-altitude broadband constellations caused market players to cancel some planned investments in new geosynchronous orbit broadband communications satellites.

SpaceX was challenged regarding Starlink in February 2021 when the National Rural Electric Cooperative Association (NRECA), a political interest group representing traditional rural internet service providers, urged the U.S. Federal Communications Commission (FCC) to "actively, and aggressively, and thoughtfully vet" the subsidy applications of SpaceX and other broadband providers. At the time, SpaceX had provisionally won $886 million for a commitment to provide service to approximately 643,000 locations in 35 states as part of the Rural Digital Opportunity Fund (RDOF). The NRECA criticisms included that the funding allocation to Starlink would include service to locations—such as Harlem and terminals at Newark Liberty International Airport and Miami International Airport—that are not rural, and because SpaceX was planning to build the infrastructure and serve any customers who request service with or without the FCC subsidy. Additionally, Jim Matheson, chief executive officer of the NRECA voiced concern about technologies that had not yet been proven to meet the high speeds required for the award category. Starlink was specifically criticized for being still in beta testing and for unproven technology.

While Starlink is deployed worldwide, it has encountered trademark conflicts in some countries such as Mexico.

Similar or competitive systems 

 OneWeb satellite constellation – a satellite constellation project that began operational deployment of satellites in 2020.
 China national satellite internet project – a planned satellite internet offering for the Chinese market.
 Kuiper Systems – a planned 3,276 LEO satellite Internet constellation by an Amazon subsidiary.
 Hughes Network Systems – a current broadband satellite provider providing fixed, cellular backhaul, and airborne antennas.
 Viasat, Inc. – a current broadband satellite provider providing fixed, ground mobile, and airborne antennas.
 O3b – Medium Earth orbit constellation that provides access to mobile phone operators and internet service providers. It covers only the equatorial region.

See also 
 AST SpaceMobile – a satellite-to-mobile-phone satellite constellation working with large mobile network operators such as Vodafone, AT&T, Orange, Rakuten, Telestra, Telefonica, etc. with the objective to provide broadband internet coverage to existing unmodified mobile phones
 Orbcomm – an operational constellation used to provide global asset monitoring and messaging services from its constellation of 29 LEO communications satellites orbiting at 775 km
 Globalstar – an operational low Earth orbit (LEO) satellite constellation for satellite phone and low-speed data communications, covering most of the world's landmass
 Iridium – an operational constellation of 66 cross-linked satellites in a polar orbit, used to provide satellite phone and low-speed data services over the entire surface of Earth
 Lynk Global – a satellite-to-mobile-phone satellite constellation with the objective to coverage to traditional low-cost mobile devices
 Teledesic – a former (1990s) venture to accomplish broadband satellite internet services
 Project Loon – former concept to provide internet access via balloons in the stratosphere

References

External links 

 
 Official Starlink Availability Map
 Starlink Satellite and Groundstation Locations, Data Links, path projection, environmental Information etc. (starlink.sx)
 Starlink Coverage Area, Satellite and Groundstation Locations for Starlink, OneWeb and GPS constellations (satellitemap.space)
 Complete Starlink Satellite Catalog allowing tracking location details from user location.
 Starlink Satellite Locations and Information on individual coverage area, connections, etc.
 See A Satellite Tonight shows when Starlink satellites can be seen.
 Shows real-time Starlink satellites position
 Starlink Professional Installers Directory
 List of Starlink dish firmware updates
 A User Friendly Real-Time SpaceX Satellite Locator

Articles containing video clips
Communications satellite constellations
Communications satellites in low Earth orbit
Communications satellites of the United States
Communications satellite operators
High throughput satellites
Internet service providers
Internet service providers of the United States
Satellite Internet access
SpaceX satellites
Spacecraft launched in 2019
Spacecraft launched in 2020
Spacecraft launched in 2021
Spacecraft launched in 2022
Spacecraft launched in 2023
Space hazards
Wireless networking
Telecommunications companies of the United States
Technology companies of the United States
Space technology